Olumuyiwa Anthony Fashanu is an American football offensive tackle for the Penn State Nittany Lions.

Career
Fashanu attended Gonzaga College High School in Washington, D.C.. He committed to Penn State University to play college football.

After not playing his first year at Penn State in 2020, Fashanu played in nine games in 2021 and made his first career start in the 2022 Outback Bowl. He took over at left tackle in 2022.

References

External links

Penn State Nittany Lions bio

Living people
American football offensive tackles
Penn State Nittany Lions football players
People from Waldorf, Maryland
Players of American football from Washington, D.C.
Gonzaga College High School alumni
American sportspeople of Nigerian descent
Year of birth missing (living people)